Wynns Coonawarra Estate is an Australian winery located in Coonawarra, South Australia within the Coonawarra wine region.

History
The estate was founded in 1891 by John Riddoch, utilizing red soil and planted vines.

In 1951, the vineyard was bought by David and Samuel Wynn, who renamed it from Chateau Comaum.

It is now the region's largest vineyard owned by Treasury Wine Estates.

References

Wineries in South Australia
Foster's Group
Treasury Wine Estates
Limestone Coast
Australian companies established in 1891
Food and drink companies established in 1891